Progressed is the first extended play by British band Take That. The collection was released on 10 June 2011 and features eight previously unreleased tracks packaged alongside Take That's sixth studio album, Progress. It was preceded by the lead single "Love Love" on 11 May. One more single, "When We Were Young", was released from the EP.

Background
Initially it was believed that Robbie Williams would rejoin Take That in a short term capacity for the album Progress which debuted at number 1 in the UK and achieved similar success across Europe, and the subsequent record breaking Progress Live tour. On 19 May 2011 Take That officially confirmed the upcoming release of Progressed, due for release on 13 June 2011 in the United Kingdom, following the release of its first single, "Love Love".

Critical reception

Progressed received positive reviews from music critics upon its release.

Simon Gage of the Daily Express praised the new material and awarded it 5 stars stating that it is "essential listening" whilst commenting that "there has been a full-bodied love affair between Take That and the British public for so long it’s difficult to imagine them ever putting a foot wrong."

Nick Levine of BBC Music similarly reviewed the album positively, concluding that the collection is "a fine Progress-complementing EP from the 10-legged national treasure."

The Independent awarded Progressed 3 stars, calling the collection a "galumphing disco electropop whose swaggering synth riffs on 'Love Love' and occasional dubstep/electro moves, as on the intro to 'Man', are swept up by standard stomp-beats" whilst Q believed it was "a bold step to add to the biggest selling album of the year but one that ultimately pays off".

Gavin Martin of the Daily Mirror reviewed the new material positively, opining that "from the trad Barlow ballad setting of 'When We Were Young' through the evolutionary electro of 'Man', the new songs successfully extend the original album's balancing act between dignified nostalgia and commercially crafted experimentation."

Heat reviewed the album positively, summarising: "all in all, we have to say this album is utterly weird and wonderful and the perfect extension to Take That's defiant Progress album of 2010. Progressed is a winner in our book."

Lewis Corner of Digital Spy praised the new material and felt that "the self-penned collection proves once again why Take That's comeback was better than everyone else's – by out-growing the stereotypical boyband branding to become a group of credible and genuinely artistic group of musicians."

Track listing

Personnel
Adapted from liner notes.

Musicians
 Gary Barlow – keyboards, programming
 Karl Brazil – drums (tracks 1, 3, 4)
 Stephen Lipson – mandolin (track 1)
 Ben Mark – guitar (track 1, 3, 5, 7)
 Stuart Price – bass guitar (tracks 1–3, 5, 7), guitar (1, 7, 8), keyboards, programming
 London Studio Orchestra – strings (tracks 1, 4, 6, 8)
 Perry Montague-Mason (tracks 1, 4, 8), Everton Nelson (6) – leaders

Production
 Stuart Price – producer, mixing engineer
 Dave Emery – assistant mixing engineer (track 6)
 Ryan Carline – engineer
 Noah Goldstein, Mike Houge, Andrew Kitchen, Ghian Wright – assistant engineers
 Will Malone – strings arranger and conductor
 Perry Montague-Mason – orchestra contractor and supervisor
 Richard Lancaster – string engineer
 Tim Young – mastering engineer

Charts

Weekly charts

 A In certain territories, Progressed charted in conjunction with Progress under the same title.

Year-end charts

Release history

References

Take That albums
2011 debut EPs